Boettgeria crispa is a species of small, very elongate, air-breathing land snails, terrestrial pulmonate gastropod mollusks in the family Clausiliidae, the door snails, all of which have a clausilium.

This species is endemic to Portugal. Its natural habitat is temperate forests. It is threatened by habitat loss.

References

Molluscs of Europe
Boettgeria
Taxa named by Richard Thomas Lowe
Gastropods described in 1831
Taxonomy articles created by Polbot